Grande-Saline is a commune in the Dessalines Arrondissement in the Artibonite department of Haiti.

References

Populated places in Artibonite (department)
Communes of Haiti